Flight from Glory is an American B movie about a run-down air cargo company in the Andes. It was directed by Lew Landers, and starred Chester Morris, Whitney Bourne, Onslow Stevens and Van Heflin. When released on August 20, 1937, Flight from Glory was considered one of the films that broke new ground in "pioneering airline sagas", comparing favorably to big-budget features such as 1936's Thirteen Hours by Air.

Plot
Ellis (Onslow Stevens) runs Trans-Andean Air Service, a run-down company transporting supplies from Delgado, a tiny, remote outpost, over the Andes Mountains to some mines. To save money, Ellis uses worn-out aircraft and "black sheep" pilots and crew no one else will employ. He hires George Wilson (Van Heflin), and is surprised when he brings his new wife, Lee (Whitney Bourne). Chief pilot Paul Smith (Chester Morris) tries to get her to leave, but the Wilsons have no money. As time goes on, George proves to be a drunk. Paul protects him as best he can, as he has fallen in love with Lee. She eventually confesses that she loves him.

After Hanson (Richard Lane}, an experienced pilot dies in a crash witnessed by George, he begins to crack up. When George is too drunk to fly, Garth Hilton (Douglas Walton) takes his place and is killed in yet another crash. Distraught and seeking revenge, George then forces Ellis at gunpoint into an aircraft and takes off. In the mountains, George jumps to his death, leaving Ellis to die like too many others he had hired. Smith is left to take over, but decides to join Lee and leave together. "Mousey" Mousialovitch (Solly Ward), the chief mechanic and former pilot, takes over the operation, with the mine owners promising new aircraft will be delivered.

Cast 
 Chester Morris as Paul Smith
 Whitney Bourne as Lee Wilson
 Onslow Stevens as Ellis
 Van Heflin as George Wilson
 Richard Lane as Hanson
 Paul Guilfoyle as Jones
 Solly Ward as "Mousey" Mousialovitch
 Douglas Walton as Garth Hilton
 Walter Miller as "Old Timer"
 Rita LaRoy as Molly, the cook
 Pasha Khan as Pepi

Production

Flight from Glory was directed by B-movie specialist Lew Landers, who would eventually helm nine aviation films for RKO Radio Pictures. Flight from Glory was one of a series of aircraft-themed adventure films, such as Air Hostess (1933), Without Orders (1936), The Man Who Found Himself (1937), Sky Giant (1938) and Arctic Flight (1952). Chester Morris also appeared in nine aviation-themed films.

Flight from Glory was primarily filmed from late-June to early-July 1937. Preston Foster was first slated for the role of "Ellis" while Chester Morris had to be obtained on loan to RKO. Flight from Glory was also one of the early films that featured Van Heflin, who was being groomed for stardom by appearing in low-budget B-features. After starring in Broadway, Heflin had made his first screen appearance opposite Katharine Hepburn in A Woman Rebels (1936).

Aircraft used in the production included: Boeing Model 100,de Havilland DH.4, Fairchild 24 and Stearman C3.

Reception
Later film reviewer Dennis Schwartz considered Flight from Glory as "a low-budget programmer fighting for elevation, that's not bad considering not much is expected." Aviation film historian James Farmer described Flight from Glory, as "(a) pulpish, predictable yarn" and disparaged the use of "... Crashes, Crashes, Crashes!"

References

Notes

Citations

Bibliography

 Dwiggins, Don. Hollywood Pilot: The Biography of Paul Mantz. Garden City, New York: Doubleday & Company, Inc., 1967.
 Farmer, James H. Celluloid Wings: The Impact of Movies on Aviation. Blue Ridge Summit, Pennsylvania: Tab Books Inc., 1984. .
 Hanson, Patrica King, ed. The American Film Institute Catalog of Motion Pictures Produced in the United States Feature Films, 1931–1940. Berkeley, California: University of California Press, 1993. .
 Pendo, Stephen. Aviation in the Cinema. Lanham, Maryland: Scarecrow Press, 1985. .

External links

Flight from Glory at TV Guide (a revised version of 1987 write-up originally published in The Motion Picture Guide)

1937 films
1937 romantic drama films
American aviation films
American black-and-white films
American romantic drama films
Films directed by Lew Landers
RKO Pictures films
1930s English-language films
1930s American films